The Double H Ranch, co-founded in 1992 by Charles R. Wood and Paul Newman, provides specialized programs and year-round support for children and their families dealing with life-threatening illnesses. The Ranch's purpose is to enrich their lives and provide camp experiences that are memorable, exciting, fun, empowering, physically safe and medically sound.

Principles
A fundamental principle of the camp is that no child should be denied the joys of childhood due to an illness or physical limitation, nor should they be restricted due to a family’s financial situation. Thus, all programs are free of charge. The Double H relies on the support of individuals, corporations, civic organizations and foundations.

The Double H offers activities which essentially define childhood; carefree play, interaction with peers, the expression of creativity through arts, song and sports. Programs allow children with Cancer, Leukemia, Sickle-Cell Anemia, Hemophilia, HIV/AIDS and Neuromuscular impairments the chance to grow both physically and emotionally.

Programs
In the summer camp program, children with life-threatening and debilitating illnesses which prevent them from attending other camps stay for a week in one of the cabins on site. They can participate in activities such as zip lining, fishing, and white-water rafting. Nurses and medical staff are able to provide all medical care necessary to ensure their safety.

In addition to the summer camp experience, Double H Ranch also offers an Adaptive Winter Sports Program. The Winter Program offers children ages 6–18 with chronic and life-threatening illnesses the opportunity to participate in various winter sports in the beautiful Adirondack Mountains. Activities include alpine and Nordic skiing, as well as snowboarding and snow shoeing.

In keeping with its mission, the Double H also provides the venue for weekends sponsored by a number of family based support programs throughout the year. These weekends serve families coping with HIV/AIDS, cancer, the loss of a child or parent, bleeding disorders, spina bifida, a child with autism, and many more.

The Double H hosts several major events throughout the year to support its programs as well as camper sponsorship fundraising initiatives. The Double H offers numerous volunteer opportunities and corporate sponsorships in support of its campers.

Notable people 
Paul Newman is one of the camp's co-founders, along with philanthropist Charles R. Wood. Proceeds from some of Newman's Own products are donated to this and its related camps. NBA Referee Dick Bavetta has had a presence at the camp in the past. Also, actor Liam Aiken has volunteered there as a counselor in the past. In 2014, Robert Irvine from Restaurant: Impossible visited the camp and helped transform and renovate it.

See also 
SeriousFun Children's Network

References

External links
Double "H" Ranch Homepage

Summer camps for children with special needs
Summer camps in New York (state)
Buildings and structures in Warren County, New York
Tourist attractions in Warren County, New York